Public bathroom may refer to:

Public toilet
Public bathing